Portugal has competed at the UCI Track Cycling World Championships.

2015

In Saint-Quentin-en-Yvelines at the Vélodrome de Saint-Quentin-en-Yvelines from 18–22 February 2015, the championships were held. A team of 3 cyclists (0 women, 3 men) was announced to represent the country in the event.

Results

Men

2016

Held at the Lee Valley VeloPark in London, United Kingdom from 2–4 March 2016, the Portugal's team at the championships consisted of 4 cyclists (0 women, 4 men) was announced to represent the country in the event.

Results

Men

References

Nations at the UCI Track Cycling World Championships
Portugal at cycling events